Tsogo Sun is a South African gaming, hotels and entertainment group. Tsogo Sun operates 15 casinos, 24 Galaxy Bingo sites, 1 Independent Site Operator Licence (ISO) as well as VSlots ("LPMs") Limited Pay-out Machines across nine provinces, including but not limited to Bet.co.za bookmaker licences, hotels, a Theme Park, multiple world-class theatres, movie cinemas, restaurants, bars and conference facilities.

Tsogo Sun means 'resurrection' or 'new life' – a term that mimics the daily rising of the sun in Setswana.

Ownership 

Prior to 2011, Tsogo Sun Holdings owned and operated two divisions: Southern Sun Hotel Interests and Tsogo Sun Gaming. On 24 February 2011, Tsogo Sun Holdings concluded a merger with and reverse listing through Gold Reef Resorts.

The group was one of the largest Johannesburg Stock Exchange listed companies in the hotel and tourism sector with a market capitalisation of R30.8 billion. Since the unbundling of its business into separate hotels and gaming interests in June 2019, Tsogo Sun Hotels (now Southern Sun) and Tsogo Sun Gaming have been listed separately on the JSE. Tsogo Sun Gaming (TSG) and Tsogo Sun Hotels (TGO trading as Southern Sun) are both owned by Hosken Consolidated Investments (47%) and public shares.

History 

The group was established in 1969, when hotelier Sol Kerzner founded the chain of Southern Sun Hotels in partnership with South African Breweries.

Prior to 1994, the group's gambling operations were limited to those hotels located in Apartheid era bantustans, as gambling in the rest of South Africa was heavily restricted. When the new democratic government came to power, gambling was legalised, which enabled the group to add 14 gaming destinations to its portfolio.

Through a process of bid applications, the group acquired five casino licences: Emnotweni (Nelspruit), The Ridge, Hemingways, Montecasino and Suncoast.

An additional two casinos, The Caledon and Blackrock (formerly known as Century Casino), were added to the group's portfolio in 2009 through the acquisition of Century Resorts Limited and Winlen Casino Operators (Pty) Limited. Subsequently, a further seven casinos were added to the portfolio through the reverse buy-out of Gold Reef Resorts in 2011: Gold Reef City, Silverstar, Queens, Mykonos, Goldfields, Golden Horse and Garden Route.

In May 2014, the group announced that it had entered into transaction agreements resulting in Tsogo Sun acquiring a 40% equity interest each in SunWest International and Worcester Casinos. This transaction gave the group a stake in all five casinos located in the Western Cape.

As of 1 June 2017 the Tsogo Sun CEO was Jacques Booysen. Jacques Booysen previously served as managing director of Gaming at Tsogo Sun Holdings since April 2007.

The group notified shareholders on 15 March 2019 of a proposed restructuring that would result in a separation of hotel and gaming interests and separate JSE listing of Tsogo Sun Hotels and Tsogo Sun Gaming.

As of 12 June 2019 Tsogo Sun was split into Tsogo Sun Gaming and Tsogo Sun Hotels. Tsogo Sun Hotels (now Southern Sun) includes individually branded hotels such as the luxury Beverly Hills and Palazzo as well as hotel brands that include Southern Sun Hotels, Garden Court, SunSquare and Hi Hotels.

On 2 February 2021 Hospitality Property Fund delisted from the Johannesburg Stock Exchange and became a wholly owned subsidiary of Tsogo Sun Hotels Limited

Tsogo Sun Gaming includes casinos precincts such as Montecasino and Gold Reef City as well as ownership of Galaxy Bingo that operates 23 bingo venues across South Africa and V Slots a leading supplier of Limited Pay Out slot machines. In 2020 Tsogo Sun Gaming acquired a majority ownership of South African sports betting website Bet.co.za.

The South African Graduate Employers Association (SAGEA) published its list of the leading graduate employers for 2021, with Tsogo Sun Hotels being chosen as a winner in the leisure sector.

In May 2022 Tsogo Sun Hotels rebranded to Southern Sun.

References

External links 
Tsogo Sun History
  Tsogo Sun Hotels Official Site
Tsogo Sun Financials
Tsogo Sun Gaming Official Site
Montecasino Official Site
Suncoast Casino Official Site
Gold Reef City Official Site
Southern Sun Official Site

InterContinental Hotels Group brands
Hospitality companies of South Africa
Casinos in South Africa
Companies based in Johannesburg
Entertainment companies established in 1969
1969 establishments in South Africa
Companies listed on the Johannesburg Stock Exchange